Events in the year 1866 in Portugal.

Incumbents
Monarch: Louis I
Prime Minister: Joaquim António de Aguiar

Events
St Andrew's Church, Lisbon established by the Free Church of Scotland.

Births
27 July – António José de Almeida, politician (died 1929)

Deaths

14 November – Miguel I of Portugal (b. 1802)

References

 
1860s in Portugal
Portugal
Years of the 19th century in Portugal
Portugal